Hennadiy Pasich (born 13 July 1993) is a Ukrainian professional football midfielder who plays for Veres Rivne.

Career
Pasich after playing for FC Dnipro reserves team and FC Dnipro-2 Dnipropetrovsk from January 2014 plays on loan for FC Naftovyk-Ukrnafta . On 29 August 2021 he scored against Desna Chernihiv in Ukrainian Premier League in the season 2021-22 at the Stadion Yuri Gagarin.

Personal life
His twin brother Yevhen Pasich is also a professional footballer.

References

External links 
 
 

1993 births
Living people
People from Kamianske
Ukrainian footballers
FC Dnipro players
FC Dnipro-2 Dnipropetrovsk players
FC Naftovyk-Ukrnafta Okhtyrka players
NK Veres Rivne players
FC Olimpik Donetsk players
FC Karpaty Lviv players
Association football midfielders
Ukrainian Premier League players
Ukrainian First League players
Ukrainian Second League players
Twin sportspeople
Ukrainian twins
Sportspeople from Dnipropetrovsk Oblast